Charles Lionel Gibbs (November 11, 1877 – September 5, 1934) was a politician in Alberta, Canada.  He served as a municipal councillor in Edmonton from 1924 until his death and, concurrently, a member of the Legislative Assembly of Alberta from 1926 until his death.

Early life

Gibbs was born November 11, 1877, in Newport, Monmouthshire, Wales and was educated at Surrey and Oxford, training as an architect.  He emigrated to Canada in 1907, and established an architecture firm in Edmonton, Barnes and Gibbs, that same year.  He also taught at the Edmonton Technical High School, and chaired the city's Parks Commission in 1912.

Politics

Edmonton municipal politics

Gibbs first sought elected office in the 1910 election, when he ran for alderman on the Edmonton City Council.  He finished ninth of eleven candidates, and was not elected (the top five were).  After this, he did not seek election again until 1914, when he was elected as a school trustee.  He served his two-year term in this position, but did not seek re-election at its conclusion.

In the 1924 election, Gibbs was elected as an alderman running on the Labour slate, finishing fourth of eleven candidates.  He finished first of twelve candidates in his 1926 re-election attempt, and was similarly re-elected in the 1928 (first of fourteen candidates), 1930 (second of twelve), and 1932 (first of fifteen) re-election attempts.  While on city council, he participated in Labour's first de facto majority on Council (while Labour only had five aldermen - Gibbs, L.S.C. Dineen, James East, Alfred Farmilo, and James Findlay - a sixth, Rice Sheppard had been elected as independent labour candidate as was sympathetic to Labour's views).

Lionel was still in office at the time of his death.

Provincial politics

Gibbs sought provincial office as a member of the Labour Party in the riding of Edmonton during the 1926 provincial election.  At the time, the riding had five seats, elected using a single transferable vote electoral system.  On the first count, he finished ninth of eighteen candidates; however, on subsequent counts the redistribution of votes from defeated candidates made him the third of five candidates elected.

He was re-elected in the 1930 election, when he finished third of seventeen candidates on the first count. His vote total was more than enough to be elected, and he with Lymburn and Duggan were awarded seats on the first count.

He was still an MLA at the time of his death in 1934.

Death

Charles Gibbs died September 5, 1934, in Sault Ste. Marie, Ontario, while on a tour of eastern Canada.

References
Edmonton Public Library Biography of Charles Lionel Gibbs
City of Edmonton biography of Charles Lionel Gibbs

1877 births
1934 deaths
Edmonton city councillors
Dominion Labor Party (Alberta) MLAs
Welsh emigrants to Canada
People from Newport, Wales
Canadian architects
Canadian military personnel of World War I
Canadian schoolteachers